Sree Lakshmi Prasanna Pictures is an Indian film production company   established by Manchu Mohan Babu on the name of his daughter Manchu Lakshmi Prasanna, in 1982. The company is based in Hyderabad. The first movie was  Pratigna which successfully ran for 100 Days. Some of the most popular blockbusters are ''Assembly Rowdy'', Rowdygari Pellam, Alludu Garu, Major Chandrakanth, Pedarayudu and Rayalaseema Ramanna Chowdary have made the Sree Lakshmi Prasanna Pictures (SLPP) as one of the premier film houses in the country.

History
In 1993 the production company produced a film Major Chandrakanth with NTR and Mohan Babu directed by K.Raghavendra Rao. It was released on 23 April 1993. The movie became a big hit at the box office. The audience were thrilled to see NTR in such a powerful role and particularly with Punya Bhoomi naa desam song in the movie, in which he was seen in the roles of Alluri Seetharama Raju, Chathrapathi Sivaji, Veerapandy Katta Brahmanna and Subhash Chandrabose. The film had stood out as one of the masterpieces in the Telugu film industry.

Film production

References

Film production companies based in Hyderabad, India
Indian companies established in 1982
1982 establishments in Andhra Pradesh